Bischoff Hervey Entertainment Television LLC (often shortened to Bischoff Hervey Entertainment or BHE TV) is a Los Angeles based production company, founded in 2003 by Eric Bischoff and Jason Hervey. The company produces and broadcasts various formed of television entertainment, including reality and games shows. Their first show was I Want To Be a Hilton. In addition, the company was involved in producing mobile games.

History
BHE TV produced a live Girls Gone Wild pay-per-view event from Florida in 2003 with WWE and another pay-per-view about the Sturgis Motorcycle Rally in 2004. They also executive produced the VH1 reality shows I Want To Be a Hilton, Scott Baio Is 45...and Single, Scott Baio Is 46...and Pregnant, and Confessions of a Teen Idol. BHE TV was also credited on CMT shows Billy Ray Cyrus...Home At Last and Outlaw Country. BHE TV also produced a professional wrestling reality show called Hulk Hogan's Celebrity Championship Wrestling in which ten celebrities were trained to wrestle and one celebrity is voted off weekly. In January 2013, Bischoff and Hervey produced the television series Hardcore Pawn: Chicago.

In 2006 BHE and Socko Energy Drinks signed a multi-year promotional deal with World Wrestling Entertainment. The following year, BHE and Socko announced a deal with Wal-Mart to carry a Hulk Hogan branded energy drink.

In 2011, BHE was filming a show called Miami's Finest: Special Operations Section, which caught on film the Miami Police Department's killing of a suspect.

In 2012 BHE TV acquired a 50% ownership stake in games-development company MX Digital founded by Ike McFadden.

In 2012 BHE entered into a consulting agreement with Total Nonstop Action Wrestling (TNA). The agreement continued until 2019, when TNA was accused of breaching the contract.

Shows
I Want To Be a Hilton
Scott Baio Is 45...and Single
Scott Baio Is 46...and Pregnant
Confessions of a Teen Idol
Billy Ray Cyrus...Home At Last
Outlaw Country
Hulk Hogan's Celebrity Championship Wrestling
Hulk Hogan's Micro Championship Wrestling
Hardcore Pawn: Chicago
See Dad Run
The Devils Ride
The Catalina
Beverly Hills Fabulous
Wrestling with Death
Dope Man
Rouge Society
Posse: The Young Guns of PBR
I Heart Nick Carter
Big Easy Brides
Bear Swamp Recovery
Lay it Down with Cee Lo Green
Finding Hulk Hogan
Party Monsters Cabo

Movies
The Butler's in Love

References

External links

Mass media companies established in 2003
Mass media companies disestablished in 2019
Defunct mass media companies of the United States
Companies based in Los Angeles